Bowman Branch is a stream in Nodaway County in the U.S. state of Missouri.

Bowman Branch has the name of William Bowman, a pioneer citizen.

See also
 List of rivers of Missouri

References

Rivers of Nodaway County, Missouri
Rivers of Missouri